Asbach-Sickenberg is a municipality in the district of Eichsfeld, in Thuringia, Germany. As a result of the 1945 Wanfried agreement, formerly Hessian Asbach-Sickenberg became part of the Soviet occupation zone and the later German Democratic Republic.

References

Eichsfeld (district)